Alms/Tiergarten (Spree) is a live album by Cecil Taylor with the Cecil Taylor European Orchestra recorded in Berlin on July 2, 1988, as part of month-long series of concerts by Taylor and released on the FMP label.

Critical reception
The AllMusic review by "Blue" Gene Tyranny states "This set is interesting primarily to hear European musicians interpret Taylor's kinesthetic directing...mostly an intense density of "free playing" (actually following specific internalized instructions and images) with almost everyone going on different gestures at once, with slow unison melodies emerging from the environment". Describing the album as “deeply moving”, The Penguin Guide to Jazz Recordings says it is “a monumental event, the colossal sonic impact tempered by Taylor’s own unflinching, instinctual control and a grasp of dynamics and dramatic possibility which is breathtaking.”

Track listing 
All compositions by Cecil Taylor.
 "Involution/Evolution" – 58:51 
 "Weight-Breath-Sounding Trees" – 63:48
 Recorded in Berlin on July 2, 1988

Personnel 
 Cecil Taylor – piano, voice
 Enrico Rava, Tomasz Stanko – trumpet
 Peter van Bergen – tenor saxophone
 Peter Brötzmann – tenor saxophone, alto saxophone, tarogato
 Hans Koch – soprano saxophone, tenor saxophone, bass clarinet
 Evan Parker – soprano saxophone, tenor saxophone
 Louis Sclavis – soprano saxophone, clarinet, bass clarinet
 Hannes Bauer, Christian Radovan, Wolter Wierbos – trombone
 Martin Mayes – French horn
 Gunter Hampel – vibraphone
 Tristan Honsinger – cello
 Peter Kowald, William Parker – double bass
 Han Bennink – drums

References 

1989 live albums
Cecil Taylor live albums
FMP Records live albums